The following things have been named after B. R. Ambedkar, an Indian jurist, economist, politician and Social Reformer, who inspired the Dalit Buddhist movement and campaigned against social discrimination towards the untouchables (Dalits), while also supporting the rights of women and labour.

Airports 
 Dr. Babasaheb Ambedkar International Airport – Nagpur, Maharashtra
 Dr. Bhimrao Ambedkar Airstrip – Meerut, Uttar Pradesh

Awards and Prizes

By the government of India
Dr.Ambedkar International Award
 Dr. Ambedkar National Award

By the government of Maharashtra
 Shahu, Phule, Ambedkar Award
 Dr. Babasaheb Ambedkar Samaj Utthan Award

District,Sub-district,Villages and other Places

District
 Ambedkar Nagar district, Uttar Pradesh
Dr. B.R. Ambedkar Konaseema district, Andhra Pradesh

Sub-district
 Dr. Ambedkar Nagar (Mhow), Madhya Pradesh

Village
 Ambedkar Nagar, village in Rajasthan.
 Dr. B. R. Ambedkar balanagar, village in Hyderabad.

Holidays 
 Ambedkar Jayanti

Hospitals 
 Tripura Medical College & Dr. B.R. Ambedkar Memorial Teaching Hospital
 Ambedkar Nagar Hospital, Delhi
 Dr.babasaheb Ambedkar Memorial Hospital Raipur, Chhattisgarh
 Dr Babasaheb Ambedkar Medical College And Hospital Rohini,Delhi
 Dr.Ambedkar Hospital And Research Center,Nagpur
 Dr.babasaheb Ambedkar Memorial Central Railway Hospital Bykhalla, Mumbai
 Dr Babasaheb Ambedkar General Hospital Kandivali, Mumbai
 Dr.B.R.Ambedkar Medical College And Hospital Bangalore
Dr.Bhimrao Ambedkar Multispeciality Hospital Govt.hospital in Noida,(Uttar Pradesh)

Memorials, Museums, parks, buildings

Andhra Pradesh
 Dr. B. R. Ambedkar Memorial Park (Dr. B. R. Ambedkar Memorial Park Smriti Vanam)

Delhi
 Statue of B. R. Ambedkar ― Parliament House, Delhi
 Dr. Ambedkar National Memorial — 26 Alipur Road, New Delhi

Madhya Pradesh
 Bhim Janmabhoomi — Birthplace of B. R.  Ambedkar, Mhow, Madhya Pradesh

Maharashtra
 Parampujya Dr. Babasaheb Ambedkar Mahaparinirvan Memorial, Chaitya Bhoomi — Mumbai, Maharashtra
 Deekshabhoomi-Nagpur, Maharashtra 
Statue of Equality (Ambedkar)-Mumbai, Maharashtra
Rajgriha - Dadar, Mumbai, Maharashtra; Ambedkar's house

Tamil Nadu
 Dr. Ambedkar Mani Mandapam — Chennai

Uttara Pradesh
 Ambedkar Memorial Park — Lucknow, Uttar Pradesh

In Other Countries
 Statue of Bhimrao Ambedkar - Koyasan University,Japan

Movies And Serials

Movies

Many films have been made on Ambedkar's life and thoughts, which are as follows:

Bheem Garjana - 1990 Marathi film directed by Vijay Pawar, starring Krishnanand as Ambedkar.

Balak Ambedkar - 1991 Kannada film directed by Basavaraj Kethur, starring Chiranjeevi Vinay as Ambedkar.

Yugpurush Dr. Babasaheb Ambedkar - 1993 Marathi film directed by Shashikant Nalawde, starring Narayan Dulke as Ambedkar.

Dr. Babasaheb Ambedkar - 2000 English film directed by Jabbar Patel, starringMammootty as Ambedkar.

Dr. B. R. Ambedkar - 2005 Kannada film directed by Sharan Kumar Kabbur, starring Vishnukanta B. Ambedkar.

Teesri Azaadi – A 2006 Hindi film directed by Jabbar Patel.

Rising Light - 2006 documentary film on Ambedkar.

Ramabai Bhimrao Ambedkar - 2010 Marathi film based on the life of Ramabai Ambedkar and directed by Prakash Jadhav, starring Ganesh Jethe as Bhimrao Ambedkar.

Shudra: The Rising - 2010 Hindi film directed by Prakash Jadhav, dedicated to Ambedkar, also contains the song 'Jai Jai Bhim'. 

A Journey of Samyak Buddha - Hindi film (2013), based on Ambedkar's book Lord Buddha and His Dhamma.

Ramabai - 2016 Kannada film directed by M Ranganath, starring Siddaram Karnik as Bhimrao Ambedkar.

Bole India Jai ​​Bhim – 2016 Marathi film directed by Subodh Nagdeve, starring Shyam Bhimsariyan as Ambedkar.

Sharanam Gachhami – 2017 Telugu film directed by Prem Raj, based on the thoughts of Ambedkar. The film also has a song titled 'Ambedkar Sharanam Gachhami', in which Ambedkar is also featured.

Bal Bhimrao – 2018 Marathi film directed by Prakash Narayan, starring Manish Kamble as Ambedkar.

Ramai – An upcoming Marathi film directed by Bal Bargale.

Periyar  -  2007 Tamil film based on the life of Periyar and directed by Gnana Rajasekaran, starring Mohan Ran as Dr. Babasaheb Ambedkar.

Stadium
 Bharat Ratna Dr. Babasaheb Ambedkar Stadium — Baramati, Maharashtra
 Dr. Ambedkar Stadium — New Delhi
 Dr. Ambedkar Stadium — Karnataka
 Dr. Bhim Rao Ambedkar International Sports Stadium — Ayodhya, Uttar Pradesh

Political Partya and organisations 
 Ambedkar International Center
Ambedkar Makkal Iyakkam
 Ambedkar National Congress
 Ambedkar Samaj Party
 Ambedkar Students' Association
 Ambedkarite Party of India
 Bahujan Samaj Party (Ambedkar)
 Birsa Ambedkar Phule Students' Association
 Bhim Army
 Bhim Sena
 Bahujan mukti morcha

Station 
 Ambedkar Nagar monorail station — Mumbai, Maharashtra
 Dr. Ambedkar Nagar railway station — Dr. Ambedkar Nagar (Mhow), Madhya Pradesh
 Dr. B.R. Ambedkar station, Vidhana Soudha — Vidhana Soudha, Bengaluru, Karnataka
 Dr. B. R. Ambedkar Balanagar metro station-Hyderabad, Telngana

University 
 Dr. Ambedkar University Delhi – Delhi
 Dr. Babasaheb Bhimrao Ambedkar Bihar University – Muzaffarpur, Bihar
 Dr. Babasaheb Bhimrao Ambedkar University – Lucknow, Uttar Pradesh
 Dr. B.R. Ambedkar National Law University – Sonipat, Haryana
 Dr. B.R. Ambedkar Open University – Hyderabad, Telangana
 Dr. B.R. Ambedkar University, Srikakulam – Etcherla, Andhra Pradesh
 Dr. B.R. Ambedkar University of Social Sciences – Dr. Ambedkar Nagar (Mhow), Dongargaon, Madhya Pradesh
 Dr. Babasaheb Ambedkar Marathwada University – Aurangabad, Maharashtra
 Dr. Babasaheb Ambedkar Open University – Ahmedabad, Gujarat
 Dr. Babasaheb Ambedkar Technological University – Lonere, Maharashtra
 Dr. Bhimrao Ambedkar Law University – Jaipur, Rajasthan
 Dr. Bhimrao Ambedkar University – Agra, Uttar Pradesh
 Tamil Nadu Dr. Ambedkar Law University – Chennai, Tamil Nadu

Schools, Colleges and Research Institutes

Andaman and Nicobar Islands
 Dr. B. R. Ambedkar Institute of Technology — Port Blair

Delhi
 Bhim Rao Ambedkar College - Delhi

Karnataka
 Dr. Ambedkar Institute of Technology — Nagarbhavi, Bangalore
 Dr. Ambedkar Medical College — Bangalore

Maharashtra
 Dr. Ambedkar College, Nagpur
 Dr. Babasaheb Ambedkar College of Arts, Commerce and Science, Chandrapur
 Dr. Ambedkar College of Commerce & Economics, Wadala, Mumbai
 Dr. Babasaheb Ambedkar arts and commerce college, Nagsenvan , Aurangabad
  Dr. Babasaheb Ambedkar law college   , nagsenvan, Aurangabad

Punjab
 Dr. B. R. Ambedkar National Institute of Technology Jalandhar — Jalandhar
 Dr. B.R. Ambedkar State Institute of Medical Sciences, Mohali

Tamil Nadu
 Dr. Ambedkar Government Law College, Chennai

Tripura
 Ambedkar College,Fatikroy-Unakoti
 Tripura Medical College & Dr. B.R. Ambedkar Memorial Teaching Hospital — Agartala

Uttara Pradesh
 Baba Saheb Dr. Bhim Rao Ambedkar College of Agricultural Engineering and Technology
 Dr Bhimrao Ambedkar Bird Wildlife Sanctuary, Pratapgarh district, Uttar Pradesh

West Bengal 
 Dr. B. R. Ambedkar Satabarshiki Mahavidyalaya — Helencha, Bagdah
 Dr. B.R. Ambedkar College — Betai, Nadia district
 Kultali Dr. B .R. Ambedkar College — Kultali, South 24 Parganas

Rajasthan 
 Dr.Ambedkar Pg College Jaipur, Rajasthan

In Other Countries

References 

Lists of things named after Indian politicians